The 1951–52 season was the 79th season of competitive football in Scotland and the 55th season of the Scottish Football League.

Scottish League Division A

Champions: Hibernian
Relegated: Morton, Stirling Albion

Scottish League Division B

Promoted: Clyde, Falkirk

Scottish League Division C

Cup honours

Other Honours

National

County

 * - aggregate over two legs
  - replay

Highland League

Scotland national team

Key:
 (H) = Home match
 (A) = Away match
 BHC = British Home Championship

Notes and references

External links
Scottish Football Historical Archive

 
Seasons in Scottish football